Katarzyna Telniczanka (1480–1528), was a Polish noble.  She was the royal mistress of king Sigismund I the Old, and the mother of three children by the monarch.

Life
She became the mistress of the king .

She became the mother of John of the Lithuanian Dukes, future bishop of Poznań (8 January 1499 – 18 February 1538), Regina (1500/1 – 20 May 1526), wed c. 20 October 1518 Hieronim Szafraniec, Starost of Cieszyn (d. 1556/59), and Katarzyna (1503 – before 9 September 1548), wed after 1522 George II Count von Montfort in Pfannberg (d. 1544).

In 1509, she married the nobleman Andrzej Kościelecki. She had one child while married, Beata Łaska z Kościeleckich, who was reputed to be the child of the king as well.

She followed her son John to his position in Lithuania, where she had great influence in his court.

References
 Wdowiszewski Z., Genealogia Jagiellonów i Domu Wazów w Polsce, Kraków 2005, pp. 182–186.

1480 births
1528 deaths
16th-century Polish people
Mistresses of Polish royalty
16th-century Polish women
15th-century Polish women
15th-century Polish nobility